Highway patrol is a police unit or agency dedicated to traffic safety compliance.

Highway Patrol may also refer to:
 Highway Patrol (film), a 1938 American action film
 Highway Patrol (American TV series), an action crime drama series
 Highway Patrol (Australian TV series), a factual television series
 Highway Patrol 2, a vehicle simulation and racing game

See also
 "Highway Patrolman", a song by Bruce Springsteen